Niels Pittomvils (born 18 July 1992) is a male decathlete from Belgium.

On the world stage he finished 22nd at the 2015 World Championships. In regional competitions he finished seventh at the 2013 European U23 Championships, fourteenth at the 2014 European Championships, did not finish at the 2015 European Indoor Championships or the 2016 European Championships, and finished seventh at the 2017 European Indoor Championships.

His personal best score is 8051 points, achieved in May 2016 in Götzis.

References

Belgian decathletes
Living people
Place of birth missing (living people)
1992 births

World Athletics Championships athletes for Belgium